Leoni May Kingsbury (1909-1970) was an English international badminton player.

Badminton career
Leoni born in 1909 was a three times winner of the All England Open Badminton Championships. She won the women's singles twice and doubles once.

Personal life
Her sister Thelma Kingsbury was also a leading badminton player.

References

English female badminton players
1909 births
1970 deaths